Knox may refer to:

Places

United States
 Fort Knox, a United States Army post in Kentucky
 United States Bullion Depository, a high security storage facility commonly called Fort Knox
 Fort Knox (Maine), a fort located on the Penobscot River in Prospect, Maine
 Knox Memorial Bridge, a bridge that crosses the Intracoastal Waterway north of Ormond Beach, Florida
 Knox, Indiana
 Knox, Henry County, Indiana
 Knox, Maine
 Knox, New York
 Knox, North Dakota
 Knox, Knox County, Ohio
 Knox, Vinton County, Ohio
 Knox, Pennsylvania
 Knox, Wisconsin, a town
 Knox Mills, Wisconsin, a ghost town
 Knox City, Missouri
 Knox City, Texas
 Knox County (disambiguation)
 Knox Township (disambiguation)

Other places
 City of Knox, Victoria, Australia 
 Knox Atoll, Marshall Islands
 Knox Coast, the coast of Antarctica lying between Cape Hordern and the Hatch Islands
 Westfield Knox, a shopping centre in Wantirna South, a suburb of Melbourne, Victoria, Australia

Ships
 USS Knox (FF-1052), the prototype and lead ship of the Knox class of destroyer escorts
 Knox-class frigate, a class of United States Navy ships
 USS Frank Knox (DD-742), a Gearing-class destroyer in the United States Navy during World War II

Organisations
 Knox Automobile Company, an American Brass Era car manufacturer
 Knox Basketball Inc, a basketball association in Melbourne, Australia
 Knox Associates, d.b.a. The Knox Company, an American company that makes security devices such as the Knox Box

Schools
 Knox Academy, a secondary school in Haddington, Scotland
 Knox College (Illinois), a liberal arts college in Galesburg, Illinois
 Knox College, Otago, one of the constituent colleges of the University of Otago in New Zealand
 Knox College, Toronto, a theological college in Toronto, Canada
 Knox Grammar School in New South Wales, Australia
 The Knox School (Australia), in Wantirna South, a suburb of Melbourne, Victoria, Australia

Churches
 Knox Presbyterian Church (Oakville)
 Knox Presbyterian Church (Ottawa)
 Knox Presbyterian Church (Toronto)
 Knox United Church (Calgary)
 Knox United Church (Scarborough), a Presbyterian Church in Scarborough, Ontario

People
 
 Knox (given name)
 Knox (surname), including list of persons with the surname
 Knox (musician) (born 1945), guitarist, singer and songwriter of original UK punk rock band The Vibrators
 Knox Cameron (born 1983), Jamaican-American soccer striker

Fictional characters
 Knox, one of the characters in the Dr. Seuss book Fox in Socks (1965)
 Knox Overstreet, a character in the film Dead Poets Society (1989)
 Florence Mccarthy ("Flurry") Knox, the protagonist's landlord and a key figure in the Somerville and Ross books
 Eric Knox, founder of Knox Enterprises, played by Sam Rockwell, a key character in the film Charlie's Angels (2000)

Other uses
 Knox Bible (Knox's Translation of the Vulgate), a 1950 twentieth century translation of the Bible by Msgr. Ronald Knox
 Knox Box, a small, wall-mounted safe that holds building keys for firefighters to retrieve in emergencies
 Knox gelatin, a brand of gelatin now marketed by Kraft Foods
 Henry Knox Trail, marking the Historic path of Colonel Henry Knox's transport of cannon during the Revolutionary war.
 Samsung Knox, an enterprise mobile security solution

See also
 KNOX (disambiguation)
 Blaw-Knox tower, a guyed tower for medium wave transmission
 John Knox House, an historic house in Edinburgh, Scotland
 Albright–Knox Art Gallery, a major showplace for modern art and contemporary art in the western New York Region
 Knox Mine disaster, a mining accident that took place near the village of Port Griffith, in Jenkins Township, Pennsylvania
 Frank Knox Memorial Fellowship, fellowships affiliated with Harvard University, given in honor of Frank Knox
 Knocks (disambiguation)
 Nox (disambiguation)